The 1997–98 Slovak First Football League (known as the Mars superliga for sponsorship reasons) was the fifth season of first-tier football league in Slovakia, since its establishment in 1993. This season started on 1 August 1997 and ended on 3 June 1998. 1. FC Košice are the defending champions.

Teams
A total of 16 teams was contested in the league, including 14 sides from the 1996–97 season and two promoted from the 2. Liga.

FC Nitra and ZTS Kerametal Dubnica was relegated to the 1997–98 2. Liga. The two relegated teams were replaced by MŠK SCP Ružomberok and Ozeta Dukla Trenčín.

Stadiums and locations

League table

Results

Season statistics

Top scorers

See also
1997–98 Slovak Cup
1997–98 2. Liga (Slovakia)

References

Slovakia - List of final tables (RSSSF)

Slovak Super Liga seasons
Slovak
1